Khlong Khuean is a district (amphoe) of Chachoengsao province, central Thailand.

Etymology
Khlong means 'canal' or 'river'. Khuean means 'dam'. Khlong Khuean and the Chachoengsao area are on the banks of Bang Pakong River. Thus, Khlong Khuean means the 'dam on the river'.

History
The district was created on 31 May 1993 by splitting it from Bang Khla district.

On 15 May 2007, all 81 minor districts were upgraded to full districts. On 24 August the upgrade became official.

Geography
Neighboring districts are (from the east clockwise): Bang Khla, Mueang Chachoengsao, and Bang Nam Priao of Chachoengsao Province and Ban Sang of Prachinburi province.

The important water resource is the Bang Pakong River.

Administration

Central administration 
Khlong Khuean is divided into five sub-districts (tambons), which are further subdivided into 32 administrative villages (mubans).

Local administration 
There are five sub-district administrative organizations (SAO) in the district:
 Kon Kaeo consisting of sub-district Kon Kaeo.
 Khlong Khuean consisting of sub-district Khlong Khuean.
 Bang Lao consisting of sub-district Bang Lao.
 Bang Rong consisting of sub-district Bang Rong.
 Bang Talat consisting of sub-district Bang Talat.

References

External links
amphoe.com

Khlong Khuean